The Battle of Monte La Difensa took place between 3 December and 9 December 1943 during Operation Raincoat, part of the Battle for the Bernhardt Line during the Italian campaign in World War II.

Background 
Monte La Difensa (also known as Hill 960) was one of the peaks forming the Camino hill mass which formed the left-hand "gatepost" dominating the Mignano Gap, key to the U.S. Fifth Army's route to Cassino, the Liri valley, and thence to Rome. The mountain itself had become a stalemate for American and British troops because of the defenses employed by the German troops, part of the Bernhardt Line.

The battle 
The action was the first combat in the Italian theatre for the US-Canadian commando unit 1st Special Service Force. They were attached to the U.S. 36th Infantry Division. The 1st SSF used the special training that they had received in winter and mountain warfare to scale the mountain and overcome the Germans atop the stronghold.

With the rest of 36th Division on 1st SSF's right attacking Monte Maggiore and British 56th Infantry Division (attacking Monte Camino) and British 46th Infantry Division on their left, it took 5 days heavy fighting for the Camino hill mass to be cleared. Casualties were high.

In media
 The successful assault on Difensa was the setting for the climax of the 1968 motion picture, The Devil's Brigade.
 Part 2 of the series WW2 Greatest Raids called "Mountain Massacre", depicting the battle, was broadcast by National Geographic.

See also
 Winter Line

Sources
 

Monte la Difensa
Monte la Difensa
Monte la Difensa
December 1943 events